Dexibuprofen is a nonsteroidal anti-inflammatory drug (NSAID).

It is the active dextrorotatory enantiomer of ibuprofen. Most ibuprofen formulations contain a racemic mixture of both isomers.

Chemistry 
Basically Dexibuprofen is a chiral switch of racemic ibuprofen. The chiral carbon in dexibuprofen is assigned an absolute configuration, (S), as per Cahn-Ingold-prelog rule.

Pharmacology 
Ibuprofen, is an α-arylpropionic acid, used largely in the treatment of rheumatoid arthritis and widely used over-the counter drug for headache and minor pains. This drug has a chiral center and exists as a pair of enantiomers. The (S)- ibuprofen, the eutomer, is responsible for the desired therapeutic effect. The inactive (R)-enantiomer, the distomer, undergoes a unidirectional chiral inversion to give the active (S)-enantiomer, the former acting as a pro-drug for the latter. That is, when the ibuprofen is administered as a racemate the distomer is converted in vivo into the eutomer while the latter is unaffected. This chiral inversion may lead to accumulation of one of the enantiomers leading to toxicity. The risk of side-effect can be avoided by the use of pure (S)-enantiomer.

See also 
 Chiral switch
 Enantiopure drug
 Chirality
 Eudysmic ratio

References 

Enantiopure drugs
Nonsteroidal anti-inflammatory drugs
Propionic acids